Saint Agatha's Vision of Saint Peter in Prison is a c.1625 oil on canvas painting by Simon Vouet, showing the imprisoned Agatha of Sicily having a vision of a visit from Peter the Apostle, who heals her wounds. It is now in the Galleria Regionale del Palazzo Abatellis in Palermo, where it entered from the former Jesuit college in Cassaro.

Paintings by Simon Vouet
1625 paintings
Paintings in Palazzo Abatellis
Paintings depicting Saint Peter
Paintings depicting Agatha of Sicily